Pandabeswar Assembly constituency is an assembly constituency in Paschim Bardhaman district in the Indian state of West Bengal.

Overview
As per orders of the Delimitation Commission, No. 275 Pandabeswar assembly constituency covers Pandabeswar and Faridpur-Durgapur community development blocks.

Pandabeswar assembly segment is part of No. 40 Asansol (Lok Sabha constituency).

Members of Legislative Assembly

Election results

2021

2016

2011

.# Change for CPI(M) calculated on the basis of its vote percentage in 2006 in the Ukhra constituency. Trinamool Congress did not contest the Ukhra seat in 2006.

References

Politics of Paschim Bardhaman district
Assembly constituencies of West Bengal